Azerbaijan Photographers Union (APU) is the public, creative, non-profit organization, based on the principles of open society, voluntariness and self-government.

It acts under the Constitution of Azerbaijan and Charter of the Union.

The Azerbaijan Photographers Union was registered in the Ministry of Justice of the Azerbaijan Republic on the 20 November 1998 by certificate number 1073.

At the beginning of 1990, with the collapse of the USSR, all working structures became worthless and it became apparent that there was need of an organization in which professional and amateur photographers — all those who are devoted to photographic art — would join together.

At that time a serious, uniting moment in the organization's establishment became preparation and holding of the Photographers of Azerbaijan exhibition in Nantes, France in November 1995, where 105 works by 24 photographers were presented.

After the exhibition in France, there were 3 years of debates, the charter's complying, overcoming obstacles, and the initiative group was formed to tackle this - registered the Union officially, although actually the Union already acted from 1994 on a voluntary basis, without legal status.

The main purposes and tasks of the APU are promotion to the national development of photo art, popularization of its achievements in the country and abroad, preservation and creative use of photographic heritage. With the purpose of promotion and development of photo art the Union organizes exhibitions, competitions, festivals, master classes, conferences and symposiums with the participation of the Azerbaijani and foreign photographers, as well as promotes the amateur movement.

10 years passed from the APU's establishment. During this period the members of the creative union have organized and taken part in more than 100 exhibitions, including more than 30 in foreign countries (USA, UK, France, Turkey, Germany, Belgium, Ukraine, Greece, Russia, Mongolia, Uzbekistan, Kazakhstan, Georgia etc.).

The Chairman of the Board is Mirnaib Hasanoglu.

References

External links 
 www.photographer.az

Azerbaijani photography organizations